Mary Nash (born Mary Honora Ryan; August 15, 1884 – December 3, 1976) was an American actress.

Early life
Mary and her younger sister, author/actress Florence, were born to James H. Ryan, a lawyer, and his wife, Ellen Frances (née McNamara). The sisters adopted the surname of their stepfather, Philip F. Nash, a vaudeville booking executive, who married their mother after the death of their father. Fortuitously, the name change would avoid conflict with actress Mary Ryan, who achieved Broadway popularity before Nash. Nash attended the Convent of St. Anne in Montreal and trained for acting at the American Academy of Dramatic Arts. Nash was Catholic.

Stage and film career
She was a stage actress in New York and London, and vaudeville. After brief appearances as a dancer at the Herald Square Theatre in 1904, she made her off-Broadway debut
on Christmas Day 1905 as Leonora Dunbar in James M. Barrie's Alice-Sit-by-the-Fire, which starred Ethel Barrymore. She remained with Barrymore for two years, acting together in Captain Jinks and The Silver Box. Her last Broadway appearance was a production of Uncle Tom's Cabin in 1933 as Cassie, which starred Otis Skinner and Fay Bainter. She was acclaimed on the London stage. She started her Hollywood career in 1936, appearing in 18 films.

She moved to Hollywood in 1934, where she acted in films until 1946. According to Allmovie: "Nash was often cast as seemingly mild-mannered women who turned vicious when challenged, as witness her work in College Scandal (1936) and Charlie Chan in Panama (1940)...Mary Nash's most sympathetic role was as the long-suffering wife of blustering capitalist J.B. Ball in Easy Living (1937)." In the 1940 film Gold Rush Maisie, she played the patient, forbearing wife and mother of a family, forced by the Dust Bowl and Depression to abandon their farm in Arkansas, that has spent five years traveling through the country in search of seasonal work.

Nash may be best known for playing villains in two Shirley Temple films, first as Fraulein Rottenmeier in Heidi (1937) and then as Miss Minchin in The Little Princess (1939). She played Katharine Hepburn's socialite mother in the movie version of The Philadelphia Story (1940). She played a supporting role in the 1936 Academy Award-winning film Come and Get It and had a featured role in the 1944 film In the Meantime, Darling.

Personal life
In 1918, she wed French actor, writer and director Jose Ruben (1888–1969); they divorced after a brief marriage.

A Democrat, she supported the campaign of Adlai Stevenson during the 1952 presidential election.

Death
Nash died in her sleep at her Brentwood, California home on December 7, 1976. She was 92. Nash is interred at St. Agnes Cemetery in Menands, NY.

Filmography

References

External links

Mary Nash at KinoTV.com
Mary Nash at Aveleyman.com
Mary and Florence Nash papers, 1893-1974, held by the Billy Rose Theatre Division, New York Public Library for the Performing Arts
Images:
Photograph by James Abbe, Captain Applejack, 1921
Portrait by Ben Solowey, Diana, 1929
Portrait by Ben Solowey, A Strong Man's House, 1929
Photograph, Cobra Woman, 1944
Photograph, 1944
Mary Nash, held by the Billy Rose Theatre Division, New York Public Library for the Performing Arts
Mary Nash in Vanity Fair October 1920 taken by Dorothy Wilding
Mary Nash in Vanity Fair March 1924 wearing large plumed headdress taken by Edward Steichen

1884 births
1976 deaths
Actresses from New York (state)
American film actresses
American silent film actresses
Actors from Troy, New York
Vaudeville performers
American Academy of Dramatic Arts alumni
20th-century American actresses
People from Brentwood, Los Angeles
American Roman Catholics
California Democrats
New York (state) Democrats